Trey Mooney (born 4 May 2002) is an Australian rugby league footballer who plays as a  forward for the Canberra Raiders in the NRL.

Background
Mooney was born in Sydney, New South Wales, Australia and is of Croatian and Maori heritage. 

He was a Cabramatta Two Blues junior.

Playing career
Mooney made his first grade debut in round 13 of the 2022 NRL season in his side's 22−16 victory over the Sydney Roosters at Canberra Stadium.

References

External links
Canberra Raiders profile

2002 births
Living people
Australian people of Croatian descent
Australian people of Māori descent
Australian people of New Zealand descent
New Zealand Māori rugby league players
Australian rugby league players
Canberra Raiders players
Rugby league locks
Rugby league players from Sydney